Nahriyeh (also Romanized as Nahrīyeh; also known as Mor‘īyeh) is a village in Veys Rural District, Veys District, Bavi County, Khuzestan Province, Iran. At the 2006 census, its population was 22, in 4 families.

References 

Populated places in Bavi County